W21 may refer to:

W21, a hydrogen bomb design for the US military
Mercedes-Benz W21, six-cylinder passenger car launched in 1933
Wanderer W21, middle-class six-cylinder sedan introduced by Auto Union's Wanderer company in 1933

fr:W21